Barbara Ann Knudson (December 4, 1927 – May 11, 2014) was an American film and television actress with more than forty  professional credits, including starring roles in Meet Danny Wilson in 1952, The Cry Baby Killer in 1958, and The Jayhawkers! in 1959.

Knudson was born in Las Vegas, Nevada, on December 4, 1927, to K.O. and Beatrice Knudson. She graduated from Las Vegas High School. She
met her future husband, William "Bill" Henry, while she was performing for the Las Vegas Little Theatre at the Last Frontier Hotel. Henry asked her to appear at the Pasadena Playhouse, where she was spotted by talent scouts.

Knudson signed with Paramount Studios in January 1950, which she chose over 20th Century Fox. Her early roles, including a small part in a party scene in a Rock Hudson film, led to a further contract with Universal-International. She married Bill Henry at a wedding ceremony on Waikiki in 1952. Prominent guests included Jack Lemmon and John Ford. The couple had one son, William "Bill" Henry Jr., in 1958. Their marriage ended in divorce in 1962.

She co-starred in the 1952 film, Meet Danny Wilson, and appeared in two episodes of The Lone Ranger in 1956.

Death
Barbara Knudson Henry died from natural causes at her home in Nevada on May 11, 2014, aged 86.

References

External links
 

1927 births
2014 deaths
American film actresses
American television actresses
Actresses from Nevada
Actresses from Las Vegas
Las Vegas High School alumni
21st-century American women